
Gmina Łyse is a rural gmina (administrative district) in Ostrołęka County, Masovian Voivodeship, in east-central Poland. Its seat is the village of Łyse, which lies approximately 31 kilometres (19 mi) north of Ostrołęka and 132 km (82 mi) north-east of Warsaw.

Villages
Gmina Łyse contains the villages and settlements of Antonia, Baba, Dawia, Dęby, Dudy Puszczańskie, Grądzkie, Klenkor, Łączki, Lipniki, Łyse, Piątkowizna, Plewki, Pupkowizna, Serafin, Szafranki, Tartak, Tyczek, Warmiak, Wejdo, Wyżega, Zalas and Złota Góra.

Neighbouring gminas
Gmina Łyse is bordered by the gminas of Kadzidło, Myszyniec, Pisz, Rozogi, Turośl and Zbójna.

References

Polish official population figures 2006

Lyse
Ostrołęka County